Alonzo Baldonado (born January 29, 1974) is an American politician and real estate broker who served as a member of the New Mexico House of Representatives for the 8th district from 2011 to 2021. A native of Albuquerque, New Mexico, Baldonado earned a Bachelor of Business Administration degree from the University of New Mexico.

Baldonado resigned from the House in December 2021 and was succeeded by Brian Baca.

Personal life
Baldonado is married to Rebecca Baldonado.

References

1974 births
Living people
Republican Party members of the New Mexico House of Representatives
People from Los Lunas, New Mexico
21st-century American politicians
Politicians from Albuquerque, New Mexico